Presidential elections were held in Slovakia on 3 April 2004, with a second round on 17 April. Although former Prime Minister Vladimír Mečiar received the most votes in the first round, he was defeated by Ivan Gašparovič in the run-off.

Eduard Kukan, who had led the opinion polling prior to the elections, was surprisingly eliminated in the first round, narrowly beaten into third place by Gašparovič. Gašparovič later admitted that he had not expect to qualify for the second round, and on first round election night he had gone home to sleep and only found out about his success when he was woken up by phone calls from friends.

Incumbent president Rudolf Schuster finished fourth with just 7% of the vote. He subsequently retired from politics.

Opinion polls

Results

References

Presidential elections in Slovakia
Slovakia
Presidential election
April 2004 events in Europe